The 1982–83 FIBA European Champions Cup was the 26th season of the European top-tier level professional basketball club competition FIBA European Champions Cup (now called EuroLeague). The Final was held at the Palais des Sports, in Grenoble, France, on March 24, 1983. Ford Cantù won their second title in a row, defeating another Italian club, Billy Milano, by a result of 69–68. In this season, FIBA reintroduced the preliminary knock-out rounds, which were abandoned after the 1975–76 season.

Competition system

 Twenty-four teams (European national domestic league champions, plus the then current title holders), playing in a tournament system, played knock-out rounds on a home and away basis. The aggregate score of both games decided the winner.
 The six remaining teams after the knock-out rounds entered a Semifinal Group Stage, which was played as a round-robin. The final standing was based on individual wins and defeats. In the case of a tie between two or more teams after the group stage, the following criteria were used:
 number of wins in one-to-one games between the teams;
 basket average between the teams;
 general basket average within the group.
 The winner and the runner-up of the Semifinal Group Stage qualified for the final, which was played at a predetermined venue.

First round

|}

Second round

Semifinal group stage

Final

March 24, Palais des Sports, Grenoble

|}

Awards

FIBA European Champions Cup Finals Top Scorer
 Antonello Riva ( Ford Cantù)

References

External links
1982–83 FIBA European Champions Cup
 1982–83 FIBA European Champions Cup
 Men Basketball European Champions Cup 1983
 Champions Cup 1982–83 Line-ups and Stats

EuroLeague seasons
FIBA